Cecil Allen may refer to:

 Cecil Allan (1914–2003), Northern Irish footballer
 Cecil J. Allen (1886–1973), British railway engineer and technical journalist and writer